Lateysha Naomi Henry (born 25 November 1992), known professionally as Lateysha Grace, is a Welsh television personality, businesswoman and model. She began her television career after appearing on the MTV reality series The Valleys (2012–2014), and has since made further television appearances in the seventeenth series of Big Brother (2016), Million Dollar Baby (2018), and Celebrity Ex on the Beach (2020).

Career 
Grace began her reality television career on the MTV series The Valleys in 2012, at the age of nineteen. In 2013, she began selling an online fashion range. In April 2014, Grace released her first single, "You Beautiful", featuring D-Jukes, though it failed to chart. The single was a plotline in the third series of The Valleys, where her fellow housemates were underwhelmed with the finished track. In 2015, she released her autobiography, titled Valleywood. In her autobiography, Grace stated that the downfall of her song was due to jealous, writing: "It could have been a classic hit but they still wouldn't have admitted they liked it because none of the other housemates had anything substantial going on in their lives."

On 7 June 2016, Grace entered the Big Brother house, to participate in the seventeenth series. She was not nominated for eviction, but was eliminated as part of an "Annihilation Week" twist on 12 July 2016, when contestant Jason Burrill was required to evict a fellow housemate in order to receive a cash prize. In 2018, Grace starred in Million Dollar Baby, an MTV series that documented herself, business partners and friends trying to raise £1 million for her daughter, Wynter. In the series, she began a children's clothing business, named Baby on Trend. In 2020, she starred in the MTV series Celebrity Ex on the Beach.

Personal life
Born in Wales, Grace is of half-Jamaican descent.  Before The Valleys, Grace worked as an accounts administrator, a hairdresser, and in a fish and chip shop. She has a daughter, Wynter, with ex-boyfriend Ben Charles.

Filmography

Discography

Singles 

 2014: You Beautiful (feat. D-Jukes)

References

External links
 

1992 births
21st-century Welsh businesspeople
Big Brother (British TV series) contestants
Living people
People from Port Talbot
Welsh female models
Welsh television personalities
Welsh women in business
Welsh people of Jamaican descent